Vovchenko is a Ukrainian surname. Notable people with the surname include:

 Mykyta Vovchenko (born 1993), Ukrainian footballer
 Semen Vovchenko (born 1999), Ukrainian footballer

See also
 

Ukrainian-language surnames